The earliest Indo-Aryan migration to Assam is estimated to have occurred between the 2nd century BCE and 1st century CE—not earlier than 500 BCE.The earliest epigraphic record suggests that the Indo-Aryan migration began latest by the middle of the 4th century CE.  They came from the Gangetic Plains into a region already inhabited by people who spoke Austroasiatic and Tibeto-Burman languages.

Pre-Indo-Aryan Assam
The 8th- to 6th-century BCE text, Shatapatha Brahmana, describes the Sanskritization of East India up to the Karatoya river, the western boundary of the historic Kamarupa kingdom.  Though the Sankhyayana Grihasamgraha is said to mention "Pragjyotisha" as the land of sunrise, this has been shown to be a wrong attribution. Archaeologically too, the Northern Black Polished Ware, a pottery style associated with the development of the first large states in Northern India, reached the Karatoya only by the 2nd century BCE. Therefore, it is claimed that the spread of Indo-Aryans into Assam cannot be pushed beyond the 5th century BCE. 

It is also significant that neither early Buddhist sources, nor Ashokan epigraphs (3rd century BCE with the capital in East India) mention the Assam region. The Periplus of the Erythraean Sea (1st century CE) and Ptolemy's Geography (2nd century CE) refer to the region that included Assam as Kirrhadia, after the Kirata people (pre-Indo-Aryan), who were also the sources of the goods that were being traded. A reference to Lauhitya in Kautilya's Arthashastra is identified by commentators with the Brahmaputra Valley, though the Arthashastra in its current form is dated to the early centuries of CE, and the commentaries to even later. 

It appears that the Assam region became a punya bhumi, a region that did not require a Hindu purification ceremony, by the post Gupta period (320-550 CE).

Introduction of Indo-Aryan
The earliest historical mention of this region in Indo-Aryan comes from Samudragupta's Allahabad inscription, where two kingdoms from the region—Kamarupa and Davaka—are mentioned.  The earliest evidence of Indo-Aryan in Assam are the 5th-century Umachal and Nagajari-Khanikargaon rock inscriptions written in Sanskrit.

Brahman settlements
In the historic period, the Kamarupa kings encouraged immigration from North India, and settled Brahmins as "islands of private domains in a sea of communally held tribal lands of shifting cultivation". Two inscriptions of Bhaskaravarman (600-650 CE) on copper plates are re-issues of grants to Brahmins to settle in parts of the Kamarupa kingdom during the reign of Bhutivarman (518-542).  This policy, of the local kings settling Brahmans from other places in the kingdom, was a common policy of all Kamarupa kings that gave rise to pockets of Brahmanic influence. From the inscriptions it can be made out that the Brahman donees came to Assam from present-day Bangladesh, Bengal, Bihar and Uttar Pradesh. The number of Brahmin grants on record remained small even post–7th century, as the land was not granted on a large scale by any ruler of the Mleccha and Pala dynasty. These early land grants had natural boundaries such as trees or water, indicating they were isolated, those from the later Pala rulers (10-11th century), increasingly bordered on other granted lands.  One such settlement was Habung in eastern Assam where Ratnapal of the Pala dynasty of Kamarupa settled Brahmins in c. the 10th century, then known as Ha-Vrnga Vishaya.

In the late medieval period beginning with the early 16th century, a number of Brahmins from Mithila, Benaras, Kanauj and Puri (Srikshetra) were settled in western Assam by the Koch kings for performing Brahminical rites and this process was later continued by the Ahom state especially under the Tungkhungia Ahom kings.

Baro-Bhuyan settlements
Non-Brahmin Indo-Aryan immigration occurred during the medieval times, and some of them came to be identified as part of the Baro-Bhuyans.

Languages
The subsequent Kamarupa inscriptions, written in Sanskrit, suggest that a majority of the Indo-Aryan immigrants spoke Kamarupi Prakrit the precursor of Assamese language and the Proto-Kamata; and that the learned few knew Sanskrit. Sanskrit was the liturgical language of Hinduism and the state language of Kamarupa; and Assamese became a link language, accepted as a second language by some of the aboriginal peoples; over time, it became the first language for many. In return, Assamese acquired linguistic features of the native speakers.  The writing shows an evolution from the early Gupta script towards modern Assamese script. The latest examples, such as the Kanai-boroxiboa inscription, use a proto-Assamese script.

Sanskritisation under the Kamarupa kings
Though traditional accounts claim that the kings of Assam were Indo-Aryan, modern scholarship concludes that the kings were originally non-Indo-Aryan.  
Sanskritization, was a process that occurred simultaneously with "deshification" (or localisation, or tribalisation) in Assam.
However, the process of Sanskritisation was never complete in Assam and significant sections of the population remained outside the  Brahmanical influence.

Modern Assamese language

The modern Assamese language is the easternmost Indo-Aryan language, spoken by over 15 million native speakers. It also serves as a lingua franca in the region. With closely related languages it is also spoken in parts of Arunachal Pradesh and other northeast Indian states.

See also
 Tibeto-Burman migration to Indian subcontinent
Varman Dynasty
 Pala Dynasty
 Indo-Aryan migration theories
 Indo-Aryan superstrate in Mitanni
 Sanskrit
 Aryan

References

Bibliography

 
 
 
 
 

 
 
 
 
 
 
 
 
 
 

 
 
 
 

 

Indo-Aryan peoples
History of Assam